Onycodes is a genus of moths in the family Geometridae erected by Achille Guenée in 1857. Both species are known from Australia.

Species
Onycodes traumataria Guenée, 1857
Onycodes rubra (Lucas, 1892)

References

Oenochrominae